Evanston railway station is located on the Gawler line.

History

It is unclear when this station was built.

In March 2012, an upgrade of the station was completed.

Services by platform

References

Railway stations in Adelaide